Beregama aurea, sometimes called the golden huntsman, is a species of spider endemic to Queensland and parts of New South Wales, Australia. It is a member of the genus Beregama of huntsman spiders.

Description 

This species closely resembles Beregama cordata. It also resembles several other Australian huntsman spiders, especially species from the genus Neosparassus, although it is much larger than most Neosparassus members.

Range 
The species is mostly found in Far North Queensland, but is apparently found as far south as Ballina, New South Wales.

References

External links 
 "Golden Huntsman, Beregama aurea - Care guide". Minibeast Wildlife. Retrieved 30 October 2022.

Sparassidae
Spiders of Australia
Spiders described in 1875
Fauna of Queensland
Fauna of New South Wales